This page provides the summaries of the matches of the group stage of the Asian football qualifiers for the 2012 Summer Olympics.

Format
The 12 teams in this round were divided into three groups of four teams each and played on a home-and-away format. The group winners from each group will advance to the main tournament in London. Three second-placed teams from this round will play each other in a playoff at a centralised venue from 25 to 29 March 2012 and the winners of this group will meet the representatives of Africa for a berth in the Olympics.

Seeding
The group stage draw took place on 7 July 2011 in Kuala Lumpur, Malaysia.

Groups
The matches were played between 21 September 2011 and 14 March 2012.

Group A

 1Qatar adjudged to have played Abdelaziz Hatem when he should have served a suspension. Original result was 1–1.

Group B

 1Iraq adjudged to have played Faisal Jassim when he should have served a suspension. Original result was 2–0 to Iraq.

Group C

Goalscorers
4 goals
 Mardig Mardigian

3 goals
 Mohamed Tayeb Al Alawi

2 goals

 Isa Ahmed
 Keigo Higashi
 Yuki Otsu
 Kim Bo-Kyung
 Kim Hyun-Sung
 Abdulaziz Al-Maqbali
 Fahad Al-Bulushi
 Hassan Al Haidos
 Omar Al Soma
 Kenja Turaev
 Ahmad Khalil

1 goal

 Hussain Farhan
 Saad Al Amer
 Sayed Shubbar
 Mustafa Ahmad
 Mohannad Abdul-Raheem
 Mohammed Saad Abdullah
 Nabeel Sabah
 Mizuki Hamada
 Genki Haraguchi
 Kensuke Nagai
 Yuya Osako
 Manabu Saito
 Hiroki Sakai
 Ryohei Yamazaki
 Takahiro Ogihara
 Hiroshi Kiyotake
 Baek Sung-Dong
 Cho Young-Cheol
 Nam Tae-Hee
 Yoon Bit-Garam
 Ahmad Hazwan Bakri
 Mahali Jasuli
 Nazmi Faiz
 Nasser Al-Shamli
 Hussain Ali Farah
 Qasim Said Sanjoor Hardan
 Hussain Al Hadhri
 Ahmed Al Nahoyi
 Ibrahim Majid
 Nasser Nabeel
 Yahya Dagriri
 Omar Khudari
 Ahmed Walibi
 Ahmad Al Douni
 Ahmad Al Salih
 Mohamad Fares
 Nasouh Nakdali
 Solaiman Solaiman
 Omar Abdulrahman
 Ahmad Ali
 Fozil Musaev
 Temurkhuja Abdukholiqov
 Oleg Zoteev

Own goals
 Yuya Osako (for Syria)

References

3